Tennant Creek Airport  is a small regional airport located near Tennant Creek, Northern Territory, Australia.

Located one kilometre from the remote outback township of Tennant Creek, the airport caters to mining companies and small predominantly Aboriginal communities in the surrounding area, providing an important link for the local population with Alice Springs, Katherine, Darwin and other regional centres.

Currently the airport is served by two airlines, Fly Tiwi (Hardy Aviation) operate twice weekly services to Darwin. In June 2013, Chartair began services twice weekly to Alice Springs after receiving a subsidy from the Federal Government to operate the route under the Remote Air Services Subsidy Scheme. Both companies usually use twin-engine Cessna 402 or 441 type aircraft for flights to and from Tennant Creek. Other operations include mail flights to outlying communities, charters and aeromedical flights.

History

World War II
During World War II the airfield was utilised as a staging airfield between South Australia and Darwin, Northern Territory by the Royal Australian Air Force.

Units that ultised Tennant Creek Airfield
No. 34 Squadron RAAF

Post-war
The terminal facilities at Tennant Creek Airport were constructed during the 1960s.

On 1 April 1989, the Federal Airports Corporation took control of the airport and on 10 June 1998, passed control and management to the Airport Development Group (ADG). ADG hold a 50-year lease over Tennant Creek Airport with free option for a further 49 years.

The current operator of the airport is Tennant Creek Airport Pty Ltd.

Airlines and destinations

See also
 List of airports in the Northern Territory

References

External links
Tennant Creek Airport

Airports in the Northern Territory
Tennant Creek